Hamaal De Dhamaal is a 1989 Indian Marathi-language comedy film directed and produced by Purushottam Berde. Bollywood actor Anil Kapoor debuted in Marathi cinema with the film. Laxmikant Berde, Varsha Usgaonkar, Nilu Phule, Shanta Inamdar, and Sonali Adhikari also feature.

Cast 

 Laxmikant Berde
 Varsha Usgaonkar
 Nilu Phule
 Sudhir Joshi
 Shanta Inamdar
 Ashok Shinde
 Girish Ghanekar
 Ravindra Berde
 Chetan Dalvi
 Sonali Adhikari
 Vaishali Dandekar
 Kishore Nandlaskar
 Nandu Madhav
 Deepak Shirke
 Vijay Patkar
 Aadesh Bandekar
 Sachin Pilgaonkar
 Mahesh Kothare
 Anil Kapoor

Soundtrack 

The songs are composed by Anil Mohile.

References

External links 

  
 Hamaal De Dhamaal at The A.V Club 
 Hamaal De Dhamaal at Rotten Tomatoes

1989 films
Indian comedy films
1990s Indian films